Jan Jacob Schultens (19 September 1716 in Franeker – 27 November 1788 in Leiden) was a Dutch orientalist. He was the son of philologist Albert Schultens. In 1742 he obtained his doctorate in theology at Leiden, later serving as a professor of Oriental languages at Herborn (1744–1749), and afterwards succeeded to his father's chair at Leiden. His son was the Dutch linguist Henry Albert Schultens.

Selected publications 
 De utilitate dialectorum orientalium ad tuendam integritatem cod. hebr, 1742.
 Oratio de fructibus redundantibus ex penitiore linguarum orientalium cognitione, 1749.
 Bibliotheca Schultensiana, sive, Catalogus librorum, quos collegit vir clarissimus Johannes Jacobus Schultensius, 1780.
 "The Albert and Jan Jacob Schultens Manuscript Collection", publisher: Princeton Theological Seminary Library, 1993.

References

Attribution

External links
 Library of Congress — the source for the Dutch version of his name (listed as John James in the 1911 Britannica)

1716 births
1788 deaths
Leiden University alumni
Academic staff of Leiden University
Linguists from the Netherlands
People from Franekeradeel
Dutch orientalists